The South West District Football League is an Australian rules football league based in South-western Victoria, with clubs located in the vicinity of Hamilton, Heywood and Portland. The league is a minor country league, with teams drawn from smaller localities within part of the area of the major Western Border Football League.

History

1969 as three leagues come together

																	

FINALS																
 																
																

																	

FINALS																	
 																	
																

																
																	

FINALS																
 																
																

The league was formed in 1970 under the name Portland Port Fairy Football League.

Of the 14 founding clubs, eight came from the Portland and District Football League, three from the Port Fairy Football League and three from the Glenelg Football League.

The league was renamed the South West District Football League in 1983.

Clubs

Current
Six of the current 8 teams were present in the league on formation in 1970 (Branxholme and Wallacedale as separate teams). Coleraine joined from the Western Border Football League in 1995, and Heywood commenced in 2012.

Former clubs
Winnap went into recess after the 1975 season
Yambuk transferred to the Warrnambool District Football League in 1981
Balmoral joined in 1982, then merged with Harrow in 1997, moving to the Horsham & District Football League
Pigeon Ponds went into recess after the 1983 season
Merino-Digby went into recess after the 1990 season
Bessiebelle went into recess after the 1998 season
Macarthur merged with Hawkesdale in 1997, moving to the Mininera & District Football League
Sandford merged with Casterton in 2013 from the Western Border Football League

Timeline

Premierships
1970	Macarthur	14	11	95	defeated	Cavendish	7	14	56
1971	Tyrendarra	14	13	97	defeated	Macarthur	11	10	76
1972	Tyrendarra	16	22	118	defeated	Heathmere	11	16	82
1973	Cavendish	15	11	101	defeated	Bessiebelle	14	11	95
1974	Cavendish	13	8	86	defeated	Westerns	6	6	42
1975	Tyrendarra	10	16	76	defeated	Westerns	8	12	60
1976	Yambuk	16	12	108	defeated	Tyrendarra	10	11	71
1977	Yambuk	7	12	54	defeated	Westerns	6	10	46
1978	Yambuk	17	12	114	defeated	Wallacedale	10	13	73
1979	Dartmoor	16	14	110	defeated	Yambuk	12	9	81
1980	Dartmoor	16	25	121	defeated	Bessiebelle	12	4	76
1981	Macarthur	16	15	111	defeated	Cavendish	8	15	63
1982	Dartmoor	22	16	148	defeated	Heathmere	10	10	70
1983	Branxholme-Wallacedale	20	10	130	defeated	Dartmoor	18	11	119
1984	Westerns	12	8	80	defeated	Tyrendarra	10	14	74
1985	Westerns	16	7	103	defeated	Heathmere	11	18	84
1986	Tyrendarra	18	19	127	defeated	Westerns	12	6	78
1987	Westerns	13	7	85	defeated	Heathmere	11	18	84
1988	Macarthur	17	19	121	defeated	Westerns	17	13	115
1989	Heathmere	18	14	122	defeated	Balmoral	12	8	80
1990	Heathmere	19	17	131	defeated	Cavendish	10	6	66
1991	Balmoral	17	14	116	defeated	Heathmere	12	12	84
1992	Cavendish	14	10	94	defeated	Westerns	5	21	51
1993	Cavendish	13	10	88	defeated	Westerns	10	9	69
1994	Westerns	17	8	110	defeated	Cavendish	12	10	82
1995	Macarthur	11	18	84	defeated	Sandford	8	14	62
1996	Coleraine	12	9	81	defeated	Sandford	9	4	58
1997	Westerns	13	9	87	defeated	Coleraine	10	12	72
1998	Westerns	11	15	81	defeated	Tyrendarra	9	8	62
1999	Westerns	14	16	100	defeated	Heathmere	11	6	72
2000	Westerns	15	18	108	defeated	Heathmere	9	6	60
2001	Tyrendarra	11	8	74	defeated	Heathmere	9	18	72
2002	Heathmere	20	10	130	defeated	Tyrendarra	14	11	95
2003	Tyrendarra	14	12	96	defeated	Coleraine	5	3	33
2004	Tyrendarra	8	12	60	defeated	Heathmere	7	12	54
2005	Coleraine	10	12	72	defeated	Tyrendarra	4	6	30
2006	Tyrendarra	14	10	94	defeated	Coleraine	7	4	46
2007	Coleraine	10	12	72	defeated	Tyrendarra	10	11	71
2008	Coleraine	9	12	66	defeated	Tyrendarra	5	11	41
2009	Coleraine	11	13	79	defeated	Westerns	4	8	32
2010	Coleraine	11	13	79	defeated	Westerns	9	10	64
2011  Dartmoor    9    12   66   defeated    Tyrendarra   4    10   34
2012  Heywood     18   9    117   defeated    Westerns    11   11   77
2013  Coleraine    15   6    96   defeated    Heywood     9    10   64
2014  Dartmoor    12   13   85   defeated    Heywood     10   9    69
2015  Heywood     8   17   65   defeated    Tyrendarra    5   12   42
2016  Tyrendarra    8   11   59   defeated    Coleraine    7   9    51
2017  Dartmoor    12   13   85   defeated    Heywood     11   13   79
2018  Heywood     11   18   84   defeated    Heathmere    8    6   54
2019  Heywood     10   11   71   defeated    Tyrendarra    3    4   22
2021  Dartmoor    Minor Premiers Awarded
2022 Cavendish     15   9  99     defeated    Dartmoor      3    6   24

Leading Goal Kickers

Historical ladders

1970 (foundation season)

2004 Ladder

2005 Ladder

2006 Ladder

2007 Ladder

2008 Ladder

2009 Ladder

2010 Ladder

2011 Ladder

2012 Ladder

2013 Ladder

2014 Ladder

2015 Ladder

2016 Ladder

2017 Ladder

References

South West District Football League

Australian rules football competitions in Victoria (Australia)